Dead of Summer can refer to:

 Dead of Summer (film), a 1970 Italian film
 Dead of Summer (TV series), a 2016 US TV series